The Battleship New Jersey Museum and Memorial is located at 62 Battleship Place, Camden, New Jersey. This museum ship preserves and displays , the most decorated battleship to have served in the U.S. Navy and one of the largest ever built.

History
in February 1991,  was retired and sent to Bremerton, Washington to serve as one of the many mothball ships, effectively making the battleship a backup in case of an emergency. USS New Jersey was slated to go to one of three sites in New Jersey: Bayonne, Jersey City, or Camden which would be chosen by the Battleship Commission. On February 3, 1999, Jersey City decided to not submit a proposal to obtain the battleship, citing unity with Bayonne and concerns about the expense of getting the battleship properly stationed there. Bayonne became a front runner to Battleship Commission chairman Joseph Azzolina, who stated that the Bayonne and Jersey City proposal would have a higher chance at attracting tourist than in Camden. Camden countered, offering four million dollars to convert the battleship into a museum if the battleship were to come to Camden. Camden wanted the battleship to enhance the waterfront and also because so many of the people who worked on building the battleship had lived in the South Jersey and Pennsylvania area.

On September 10, 1999, the Battleship Commission selected Bayonne as the site for the battleship New Jersey. People from South Jersey were not pleased with the ruling, as many of the people who voted on where the battleship would end up were from North Jersey. The commission decided that the Navy would decide where the battleship will end up. On November 11, 1999, the battleship arrived in Philadelphia after being transported from Washington. The arrival into Philadelphia was scheduled to be temporary and would be moved to either Camden or Bayonne once a place was finalized.  On January 21, 2000, the Navy decided that Camden would host the battleship due to many factors, including a much more detailed plan by Camden about what they would do with the battleship, the money that Camden was willing to donate to the battleship, and a scare that Intrepid, another museum ship, would be overshadowed by the battleship.  Congress had 30 days to reverse the decision for the battleship to go to Camden, but ultimately decided to agree with the Navy.

On February 7, 2001, the battleship got approval to their pier changes they wished to implement, but still needed to be given an exception to dredge the area during the spring fish mating season.  On May 8, 2001, the United States Army Corps of Engineers approved the dredging of the Delaware River in order to have the battleship stationed at the new dock.  The ship needed  of depth clearance in order to fit.  Excess dredging materials went to the National Park in Gloucester County.

Originally, the battleship museum was planning to open Labor Day weekend, but was ultimately delayed due to Tropical Storm Barry delaying a shipment of materials for the battleship.  Opening day got delayed to October 15, 2001.  The museum ran tour groups of 15 people that lasted anywhere from 90 minutes to 120 minutes and covered 7 decks of the ship.  The museum expected to have 1,500 people per day during the first few opening days.  Within the first couple of days, most reviews were positive, however some were not happy with the touring situation.  Some wished that people were allowed to explore the museum on their own without needing to be on a tour.

Exhibits 
 Mark 2, 40 mm quad gun mount: Gun mount used between 1939 and 1950.  Used as intermediate anti-aircraft weapon
 Mark 2, 40 mm single gun mount: Gun mount used between 1939 and 1950. Used as a close range anti-aircraft weapon

 Mark 28 5-inch/38-caliber gun mount: Gun mount used against all targets
 Mark 15 20 mm Phalanx: Gun mount used against missile attacks
 BGM-109 Tomahawk cruise missiles: Contained 32 missiles
 RGM-84 Harpoon cruise missiles: Missiles used against ships
 16-inch/50-caliber Mark 7 gun: Used for shore bombardment.
 Crew's Quarters
 Radio Control Room
 Radar Room
 Senior Staff Cabin

Donations 
A Little Slice of New York, Georgetti Market, and Finnaren & Haley, and Williams Gas Pipeline-Transco of Houston donated pizza's, sandwiches, paint, and cathodic protection respectively toward the restoration effort. Prior to opening, the battleship looked for volunteers to help lead guided tours of the battleship. Over 90,000 hours of donated time went into getting the museum ready for opening day. After opening, Vector Security, Radionics, and Interlogix donated alarm system and security devices totaling more than $50,000.

Renovations 
L3 Communications and Lockheed Martin helped to restore the ship's intercom system and donated money for the battleship to print and distribute brochures for the battleship.

See also
 U.S. Navy memorials
 U.S. Navy museums (and other battleship museums)
 List of maritime museums in the United States
 List of battleships of the United States Navy
 List of museums in New Jersey

Notes

External links
 Battleship New Jersey Museum and Memorial official website
 

Naval museums in the United States
Maritime museums in New Jersey
Military and war museums in New Jersey
Monuments and memorials in New Jersey
Museum ships in New Jersey
Museums in Camden County, New Jersey
Museums established in 2001
Buildings and structures in Camden, New Jersey
Tourist attractions in Camden, New Jersey
2001 establishments in New Jersey
Battleship museums in the United States